Jennifer Maccarone is a Canadian politician in the province of Quebec. Maccarone was elected to the National Assembly of Quebec in the 2018 provincial election. She represents the electoral district of Westmount–Saint-Louis as a member of the Quebec Liberal Party. Maccarone is currently serving as the Official Opposition Critic for Families and for People Living with a Handicap or on the Autism Spectrum and the Official Opposition Critic for LGBTQ2 Rights.

Biography 
Maccarone studied at Marianopolis College and McGill University. She began her career as an entrepreneur in marketing and communications, gaining over twenty years of experience in the industry.

Her career in public service began with Quebec's English school boards, as Chair of the Sir Wilfrid Laurier School Board. From 2015 until September 2018, she served as the President of the Québec English School Boards Association.

A mother of two autistic children, Maccarone was designated as the first politician in Canada to hold the responsibility for people on the Autism Spectrum. In the November 2019, she proposed that the National Assembly's Health and Social Services Committee study services for young people with autism as they transition to adulthood.

In February 2020, Maccarone became the first elected official of the National Assembly to hold the official title of Critic for LGBTQ2 Rights. She is also the first elected member of the Quebec Liberal Party to openly describe themselves as LGBTQ2.

References

Living people
Quebec Liberal Party MNAs
21st-century Canadian politicians
Politicians from Montreal
Women MNAs in Quebec
Year of birth missing (living people)
Bisexual politicians
Canadian LGBT people in provincial and territorial legislatures
Anglophone Quebec people
21st-century Canadian women politicians
21st-century Canadian LGBT people